TIWAG may refer to:

 Tiroler Wasserkraft, electric power company in Austria
 Tonwaren-Industrie Wiesloch, brickworks in Germany